Halls High School is a high school in the Halls Crossroads suburb of Knoxville, Tennessee, operated by Knox County Schools. Founded in 1916, the school was one of the first in the area. It is named for Pulaski Hall, a prominent citizen and owner of one of the first businesses in the town.

The school includes the North Knox Career and Technical Education Center.

The principal is Spencer Long, who replaced the retiring, Mark Duff.  Mr. Duff was a longtime history teacher at Halls High before entering administration in Knox County Schools.  Spencer Long is a alumni of Halls High School.

Academics

Halls High School offers an extensive academic array from technical studies to college preparatory programs.  The school shares its campus with the North Knox Career and Technical Education Center, a school that provides intense, hands-on studies in a variety of fields.  The school also sponsors many clubs and academic societies including:

Athletics
The Red Devils football team won the AAA state championship in 1986, and finished runner-up behind Pearl Cohn in 1996.  The men's golf team won the Tennessee state championship in 1986, 2016, and 2017.  In 2010 the school hosted the 1st Annual Halls High School Golf Tournament.  The Red Devils Baseball team was ranked 15th in the nation in the 2010 season by ESPN RISE. Also, in 2013, 2014, 2015, 2017, 2018, and 2019 the Halls wrestling team won 1st in the dual district tournament, 1st in dual regions, and 1st in individual regions. The team has placed Top 10 in the individual and dual state for the 2014, 2015, 2016, 2017, and 2018 season. They have placed two individuals in 2014, 2015, and 2018; placed three in 2016, and 2018; and four in 2017. On February 4th of 2023 halls high school wrestling team won the state championship.

Notable alumni
 Chad Finchum, racing driver
 Hadley Gamble, CNBC presenter
Wes Kitts, Olympic Weightlifter

External links 
 Official school website

References

Schools in Knox County, Tennessee
Public high schools in Tennessee
1916 establishments in Tennessee